The COVID-19 pandemic in Beijing is a part of the worldwide pandemic of coronavirus disease 2019 (COVID-19) caused by severe acute respiratory syndrome coronavirus 2 (SARS-CoV-2). The disease first reached Beijing on 20 January 2020.

Timeline

2020

January 
On 20 January 2020, the Daxing District Health Committee informed that 2 patients with fever were diagnosed with the new coronavirus. They had visited Wuhan and had been isolated and treated without respiratory symptoms. This case is the first report of a case found in Beijing.

On 21 January, the Beijing Municipal Health Commission issued an announcement saying that Beijing has added five new cases of new coronavirus pneumonia. Among the 5 people, 3 are male and 2 are female. The oldest is 56 years old and the youngest is 18 years old. They all have travel history in Wuhan. As of 18:00 on 21 January, a total of 10 confirmed cases were reported in Beijing.

On 22 January, Beijing Municipal Committee of the Chinese Communist Party and Beijing Municipal Government decided to establish a leading group for the prevention and control of new coronavirus infection pneumonia, with medical security, Seven groups including transportation guarantee, commodity supply, service guarantee for major events, public opinion response, social stability, and college work. On the same day, 4 new cases were reported, and 14 cases were accumulated.

On 23 January, Palace Museum announced that it would be closed from 25 January to prevent and control the epidemic. At the same time, many museums and art museums including National Museum of China, National Library of China, Prince Gong's Mansion, National Art Museum of China have closed, and the Beijing Miaohui was cancelled.

In the early morning of 24 January, the Beijing Municipal Health Commission informed that from 14:00 to 24:00 on 23 January, there were 4 new cases of pneumonia caused by new coronavirus infection in Beijing, all of whom were male, aged from 21 to 65 years old. They have had a history of contact with Hubei. On the afternoon of the same day, Beijing re-informed 3 newly confirmed cases. A woman living in Daxing District recovered and was discharged on the same day. On the same day at 5 pm and 8 pm, the Beijing Municipal Health Commission notified 5 newly confirmed cases and 2 cases.

On 25 January, a male patient living in Daxing District recovered and was discharged, the second discharged patient in Beijing. On the afternoon of the same day, the Beijing Municipal Health Commission notified 5 newly confirmed cases, 2 of which were cases with no history of contact with Hubei.

Starting from 26 January, all inter-provincial passenger transport and inter-provincial tour chartered vehicles entering and leaving Beijing were suspended, Beijing's universities, middle schools, primary schools, and kindergartens were delayed, and offline training by off-campus training institutions were suspended, Beijing Film Academy examination postponed. On the same day, the Beijing Municipal Health Commission notified 10 newly confirmed cases. In addition, the Beijing Municipal Health Commission also notified that 3 doctors had been infected, 2 of whom had been to Wuhan on business. They received isolation treatment.

In the early morning of 27 January, the Beijing Municipal Health Commission notified that there were 5 new cases of pneumonia infected by the new coronavirus in Beijing from 18:00 to 21:00 on the 26th. One of the cases was a 9-month-old baby girl who became ill on January 25 and went to see a doctor on the 26th. She had contact history in Hubei before. At 3 pm on the same day, the Beijing Municipal Health Commission reported that from 21:00 on the 26th to 9:00 on the 27th, Beijing had 4 new cases of pneumonia infected with the new coronavirus, of which one was a close contact of the previously confirmed case. As of 9:00 on 27 January, Beijing has reported a total of 72 confirmed cases, including 1 in Dongcheng District, 7 in Xicheng District, 11 in Chaoyang District, 17 in Haidian District, 4 in Fengtai District, 2 in Shijingshan, and Tongzhou District. There were 6 cases, 1 case in Shunyi District, 5 cases in Daxing District, 7 cases in Changping District, and 11 cases in Beijing from other places. That night, the Beijing Municipal Health Commission notified the details of the first death. The deceased was 50 years old. He went to Wuhan on 8 January. After returning to Beijing on the 15th, he developed a fever and sought medical attention on the 21st. He was diagnosed with a new coronavirus infection on the 22nd and his condition deteriorated. Due to respiratory failure, he died on the 27th due to ineffective rescue efforts. According to media reports, the dead patient was Yang Jun, former vice president of Trina Solar, executive president of China Commercial Value Group, and employee of the project development department of Shanghai Electric's design company.

On the morning of 28 January, the Beijing Municipal Health Commission notified 8 new cases of pneumonia infected by the new coronavirus, of which one was a close contact of the previously confirmed case. In the afternoon of the same day, 11 new cases of pneumonia infected by the new coronavirus were notified, of which 5 cases had contact history in Hubei and 7 cases were close contacts of previously confirmed cases. As of 12:00 on 28 January, Beijing had a total of 91 confirmed cases. Among them, 2 cases were in Dongcheng District, 8 cases in Xicheng District, 17 cases in Chaoyang District, 21 cases in Haidian District, 7 cases in Fengtai District, 2 cases in Shijingshan District, 7 cases in Tongzhou District, 2 cases in Shunyi District, 7 cases in Daxing District, and 7 cases in Changping District as well as 11 cases of foreigners who came to Beijing. On the same day, two patients with pneumonia infected by the novel coronavirus who were treated at the Fifth Medical Center of the PLA General Hospital in Beijing recovered and were discharged. The High School Affiliated to Renmin University of China issued a statement that the parents of the third-year high school students were infected with the new type of coronavirus pneumonia and died after treatment.

On 29 January, the Beijing Municipal Health Commission notified 11 new cases of pneumonia caused by the new coronavirus, of which 7 had contact history in Hubei and other provinces, 7 were close contacts of confirmed cases, and 1 had not yet completed the epidemic According to scientific investigation, 4 cases were close contacts with both a history of contact in Hubei and confirmed cases. There were 6 males and 5 females, aged between 2 and 80 years old. On the evening of the same day, Beijing added 9 new cases of pneumonia caused by the new coronavirus, of which 7 had contact history in Hubei and other provinces, 2 were close contacts of confirmed cases, 6 were males and 3 were females, aged 25 Between the ages of to 80 years. In the afternoon, Pang Xinghuo, deputy director of the Beijing Municipal Center for Disease Control and Prevention, stated at a press conference that the epidemic in Beijing is in the transitional stage from the import period to the spread period.

On 30 January, the Beijing Municipal Health Commission notified 3 new cases of pneumonia caused by the novel coronavirus, 2 of which had contact history in Hubei and other provinces, 1 was a close contact of the confirmed case, 2 were men and 1 were women For example, the age is between 21 and 73 years old. In the afternoon of the same day, Wang Guangfa, director of the Department of Respiratory and Critical Care Medicine of Peking University First Hospital, was discharged from Ditan Hospital.

On 31 January, the Beijing Municipal Health Commission notified 7 new cases of pneumonia caused by the new coronavirus from 8:00 to 20:00 on 30 January, of which 2 cases had contact history in Hubei and other provinces, and 5 cases were close to confirmed cases Contact; another case was discharged. On the same day, it was notified that 11 new cases of pneumonia infected by the new coronavirus were reported from 20: 00 to 24:00 on the 30th. Among them, 7 had contact history in Hubei and other provinces, 5 were close contacts of confirmed cases, and 1 of them had existing Hubei. The contact history is also a close contact of the confirmed case; 7 new coronavirus-infected pneumonia cases were added from 24:00 on the 30th to 14:00 on the 31st, of which 6 cases have contact history in Hubei and other provinces, and 5 cases are close contacts of the confirmed case Among the contacts, 4 cases had contact history in Hubei and other provinces and were close contacts of confirmed cases.

June
Although China managed to flatten the curve quite well, there was a concern that another second wave of coronavirus will wreak havoc in Beijing, i.e. already spiked some 137 new local cases in a few days in mid-June 2020. Thus Beijing will be on its way to a lockdown soon. Nonetheless, the number of deaths from COVID-19 is still rather low at only nine victims.

2022

April
There were reports of panic buying by residents to stock up supplies on 24 April 2022 due to a new Omicron variant outbreak in the city. As a response to the outbreak, authorities ordered three rounds of mass testing on all of its residents to and avoid another citywide lockdown similar to Shanghai. On 29 April, Beijing closed all schools, with students making up more than 30% of the 150 total cases since the start of the wave two weeks prior.

May 
On 3 May, Beijing reopened their isolation facility.

2021

See also
 COVID-19 pandemic in mainland China
 COVID-19 pandemic in Shanghai

References

Beijing
Beijing
Health in Beijing
21st century in Beijing
2020 in China
2021 in China